Galeb is Bosnian/Croatian/Serbian and Slovenian word for "seagull". It can refer to any of the following:
Galeb-class minelayer which saw service with Yugoslav navies between 1921 and 1962 
Yugoslav Navy Yacht Galeb, presidential yacht used by Josip Broz Tito
 Series of Yugoslavian trainer/attack jet aircraft designs two of which entered production:
Soko G-2 Galeb, first flown in 1961
Soko G-4 Super Galeb, first flown in 1978
Galeb (computer) - a Yugoslav-made home computer from the early 1980s

Unrelated to south Slavs, there are also:

 Galeb duhr, a creature in Dungeons & Dragons fantasy role-playing game
 Yacin Yabeh Galeb, former chief of staff of Force Nationale de Police of Djibouti